Hinna is a borough of the city of Stavanger which lies in the southwestern part of the large municipality of Stavanger in Rogaland county, Norway. The borough includes the southernmost part of the city, bordering the city of Sandnes. The borough of Hillevåg lies to the north, the municipality of Sola lies to the west, and the Gandsfjorden lies to the east. Hillevåg was a part of the old municipality of Hetland until 1965. The borough has residential areas as well as some industrial areas, especially relating to the oil industry. The  borough has a population (2016) of 22,581.

Neighbourhoods
Although the borders of "neighbourhoods" do not correspond exactly to the borough borders, Hinna roughly consists of the following neighbourhoods: Jåtten, Gausel, Godeset, Forus, and southern Vaulen.

Politics
Hinna borough is led by a municipal borough council. The council consists of 11 members, with the following party allegiances:

References

Boroughs and neighbourhoods of Stavanger